Carinostoma is a genus of harvestmen in the family Nemastomatidae with 3 described species from southeastern Europe.

Species
There are currently 3 described species in the genus Carinostoma:

Carinostoma carinatum (Roewer, 1914)  Northern Italy and Austria south to Serbia and Montenegro
Carinostoma elegans (Sørensen, 1894)  Western Ukraine and Slovakia, south to Serbia and Bulgaria
Carinostoma ornatum (Hadzi, 1940)  Bosnia & Herzegovina west to Bulgaria, and south to Central Macedonia

References

Harvestman genera
Arachnids of Europe